Basque Country national rugby union team (Basque: Euskadiko errugbi selekzioa) is the national and/or representative rugby union team of the Basque Country. It is also sometimes referred to as the Basque Selection. They made their international debut on 14 May 1983 against Wales while the latter were on a tour of Spain. The Basque Country lost this game 3–24. Since 1985 the team has been organised by the Basque Rugby Federation.

History

Friendlies
Since making their international debut against Wales in 1983, the Basque Country has regularly played international friendlies. They have also played regular friendlies against Basque club teams, including Aviron Bayonnais and Biarritz Olympique, and against touring club and provincial teams, including Ulster and Leinster.

Competitions
Since 1983–84 the Basque Country have competed in the Spanish Regions Championship, featuring other teams, such as Catalonia, representing the autonomous communities of Spain. This competition is organised by the Spanish Rugby Federation. The Basque Country were the inaugural winners of this competition. Since 2001–02 they have also competed in the European Regions Championship. On  8 December 2011 the Basque Country also played a Lisbon XV in the final of the Iberian Regions Cup, losing 22–30.

List of international results

Notes
 Spanish Regions Championship final

Recent results

Honours
Spanish Regions Championship
Winners: 1983–84, 1984–85, 1993–94, 1995–96, 1996–97, 1997–98, 1998–99, 2002–03, 2003–04, 2004–05, 2005–06, 2006–07, 2008–09, 2010–11: 14   
Runners-up: 1987–88, 1994–95, 2000–01, 2000–01, 2001–02 : 5
Iberian Regions Cup
Runners-up: 2011 : 1

See also
 Basque Country women's national rugby union team
 List of Basque rugby union players

References

 
rugby union
Rugby union in the Basque Country (greater region)
1983 establishments in Spain